Temple Beth-El is a Reform synagogue in Jersey City, New Jersey. located at 2419 Kennedy Boulevard in the Bergen Section.

History

At end of the Civil War (c. 1864-65), a group of Jews in Jersey City began to meet in study and prayer in the Orthodox Jewish tradition downtown at 96 Montgomery Street, and then a group moved nearby to York St. They formalized this community under the name of the Isaac Ephraim Congregation, then Beth Israel Congregation, and finally Temple Beth-El in 1871.

Earliest Temple records date back to 1891.

Some years later a group of congregants left B'nai Ephraim to found a branch of Reform Judaism in the city. The Reform members moved for a time to a former Christian church at Grove and Montgomery streets. Its spiritual leader, Rabbi J. Schweizer, sought to lead "a more liberal interpretation of Jewish faith" ("Will Build") making changes in temple practices. He held Friday services at 8:15 PM rather than sundown and Saturday services at 10:00 AM to accommodate a larger number of men and women and started a popular Sunday school. His founding of a Young People's Hebrew Association and Helping Hands Society gave the temple greater visibility in the community for its charitable programs and was increasingly popular with the new Jewish settlement in Jersey City. An 1892 newspaper article comments on Rabbi Schweizer's lectures delivered in English rather than Hebrew: "He argues that English is the language with which his congregation is most familiar, and he intends to so conduct the service, that even the stranger within the gate may understand him. Finally Rabbi Schweizer also introduced an organ and a choir" ("Will Build A Temple." Evening Journal 26 January 1892).

Rabbi Schweizer eventually led the reform members to leave B'nai Ephraim to the orthodox congregants. They set out to build a new synagogue at York Street between Varick and Monmouth streets, where it purchased two lots in 1891. The new Reform synagogue was named Temple Beth-El, meaning House of God, and looked to become the center of Reform Judaism in Jersey City.

In 1914 Temple Beth-El appointed Rabbi/Doctor Maurice Thorner of the Jewish Reform movement as their spiritual leader; he brought the temple into the Union of American Hebrew Congregations that represents the Reform branch of Judaism. In an interview in 1996, Rabbi Kenneth Brickman explained that Temple Beth-El "was philosophically Reform, but was always spiritually more traditional than other Reform congregations" (Quoted in Hileman). Its Reform practices included confirmation and wearing of yarmulkes in temple. The Congregation's liberal roots can also be seen throughout the years, including the resolution that passed overwhelmingly at the Annual Meeting on October 19, 1921, that elected a slate including three women to the board of trustees. Since 1921, women have served on its elected board of trustees, Blanche Dorfman becoming its first woman president in 1984.

The Reform temple remained in downtown Jersey City until September 1926 when it moved to its present location on Kennedy Boulevard. On property purchased in  1922, a ground-breaking ceremony took place on June 7, 1925 for a new temple. In early September, 1926, on the eve of Rosh Hashanah,  the new sanctuary was consecrated. At the inaugural service, the Torahs were carried in solemn procession by the officers and trustees and placed in the ark. Among the many dignitaries present were Governor A. Harry Moore, Mayor Frank Hague, Rabbi Stephen S. Wise and Rabbi Benjamin Plotkin.

Temple Beth-El's building is inspired by the Hagia Sophia in Istanbul. The brick, domed, Byzantine revival synagogue building was  designed by architect Percie Vivarttas of Weehawken. The red brick façade features an arched roofline that forms a pattern in contrasting brick on the walls below and over the front door entrance and side windows. The inset roof with a dome has a central stained glass oculus, permitting light to filter into the building. The sanctuary had walnut pews for a seating capacity of one thousand; the pews facing a deep archway over the altar and Ark of the Covenant.

In 1936 Rabbi Samuel A. Berman became the rabbi of the congregation and served with distinction for fifty years.  The congregation grew and flourished under his leadership, along with Cantor Abraham Berman, continuing its tradition of serving others. Temple Beth-El has an established tradition of community service in Jersey City. During World War I, its members assisted with a recreation fund for soldiers' camps and one for war victims. Its Sisterhood volunteered to work for the Red Cross during World War II. Congregation members supported the creation of the State of Israel in 1949 and sponsored bond drives for Israel. After the Jewish Community Center on Bergen Avenue closed, the temple took over that role for several Jewish groups, such as Hadassah, the Jewish War Veterans, and the United Jewish Association (United Jewish Appeal of Jersey City). During the 1960s, it housed a Head Start program at the shul. Many notable Jersey City leaders were members of the congregation.   Interim mayor of Jersey City Charles K. Krieger (August–November 1971) served as president of the temple.  Morris Pesin, one of the founders of Liberty State Park, was also a leader at Temple Beth-El. The congregation has also been an advocate for civil rights and holds an Annual Dr. Martin Luther King Jr. Sabbath Service each January with an African-American speaker.  This tradition began after the congregation joined its neighbors at a talk given by Dr. King Jr. at the nearby A.M.E. Zion Church on Bergen Ave. shortly before Dr. King's assassination.

When a fire destroyed the Clair Memorial United Methodist Church on Communipaw Avenue on April 10, 2001, the board of trustees of Beth-El invited the African-American parishioners to hold their Easter service at the Temple. This led to a continuation of the practice as Clair Memorial held its Sunday services in the social hall until its own church building re-opened. In August 2001, the Congress of Racial Equality (CORE) presented the Temple and Clair Memorial its Harmony Award "celebrating amicable relationships between whites and blacks" (Rinn). In recognition for this good deed, about thirty employees of Goldman-Sachs, as part of its Community Team Works program, sought to reward the Temple. In May 2003, the volunteers helped with the construction of a much-needed ramp for handicap access to the sanctuary on the first floor.

Temple Beth-El reached its peak of membership in the 1950s and 1960s with 700 families and over 300 students in its Hebrew school. The congregation had 550 families in 1971, 380 families in 1984, and approximately 175 families in 2001. The decline of the Jewish population in Jersey City, by moving to the suburbs or retirement communities, affected the temple. However, the arrival of newcomers to the city during the real estate boom on the Jersey City waterfront and around the city from 2000 onward, has revitalized the congregation.

One of the hallmarks of the congregation is its outreach to a diverse Jewish community, especially its welcoming of the LGBTQ community, interfaith households, and those from many ethnic and cultural backgrounds.  Members come from all over Hudson County and beyond. The congregation also adopted an innovative membership program in 2012 called Terumah, which allows households to make an annual voluntary pledge in place of traditional annual dues.  In 2012 the congregation also made its High Holy Day services equally open to members and non-members without any required donation.

When the condition of the building declined, the congregation considered developing part of its property to raise funds. This plan was dropped after research showed it was more advantageous to keep the full temple lot intact.

The members voted in 2015 to remain at their current location and renovate the main sanctuary building. Hurricane Irene in 2011 had caused considerable damage to an already compromised roof, leading to issues with ceilings and walls in the building. Temporary repairs were made but an expensive roof replacement was needed. This was completed in 2016 as the first step in the renovation process.

From 2011 to 2017 the congregation was served by Rabbi Debra Hachen. The congregation's membership grew from a low of around 90 households around 2008 to a membership of 150 households in 2016 as demographics in Hudson County began to change and many younger adults and families sought out urban living.  The congregation established a Jewish Young Adults of Jersey City group in 2013.  The religious school of Temple Beth-El served over 50 children as of 2016.  Temple Beth-El was also a founding congregation in the interfaith community organizing group known as Jersey City Together which began in 2015.

On the morning of October 3, 2016, Temple Beth-El celebrated the 90th anniversary of the sanctuary building during the Rosh Hashanah worship service.

In 2018 Rabbi Leana Moritt took over the pulpit as Rabbi and Spiritual Leader of Temple Beth-El.  In the next two years the temple community continued to grow with family membership approaching 180 families and with religious school enrollment of 75 children.  Temple Beth-El intends to celebrate the 100th Anniversary of its current building in 2026 in a newly renovated space.  A campaign was started to raise the necessary funds to create a modern, energy-efficient, space for the next 100 years.

See also
Congregation Adas Emuno (New Jersey)
United Synagogue of Hoboken
Jewish Museum of New Jersey

References

External links
BethEL-JC website
JC Venues:Beth EL
 Jewish Virtual Library: Hudson County

Byzantine Revival synagogues
Byzantine Revival architecture in New Jersey
Reform synagogues in New Jersey
Buildings and structures in Jersey City, New Jersey
Religious buildings and structures in Hudson County, New Jersey